Players and pairs who neither have high enough rankings nor receive wild cards may participate in a qualifying tournament held one week before the annual Wimbledon Tennis Championships.

Seeds

  Romina Oprandi (qualified)
  Julia Vakulenko (qualifying competition, lucky loser)
  Kateřina Böhmová (withdrew)
  Aravane Rezaï (first round)
  Hsieh Su-wei (moved to main draw)
  María Emilia Salerni (second round)
  Zuzana Ondrášková (qualifying competition)
  Vasilisa Bardina (qualified)
  María Vento-Kabchi (first round)
  Galina Voskoboeva (qualifying competition)
  Tatiana Poutchek (qualifying competition)
  Kirsten Flipkens (qualified)
  Yuliya Beygelzimer (second round)
  Lioudmila Skavronskaia (first round)
  Anda Perianu (first round)
  Olga Puchkova (qualifying competition)
  Nicole Pratt (qualified)
  Meilen Tu (qualified)
  Yvonne Meusburger (first round)
  Mathilde Johansson (first round)
  Kathrin Wörle (first round)
  Arantxa Parra Santonja (second round)
  Aleksandra Wozniak (first round)
  Milagros Sequera (second round)
  Séverine Brémond (qualified)
  Ahsha Rolle (second round)

Qualifiers

  Romina Oprandi
  Nicole Pratt
  Séverine Brémond
  Tamarine Tanasugarn
  Clarisa Fernández
  Kristina Barrois
  Chan Yung-jan
  Vasilisa Bardina
  Ivana Abramović
  Meilen Tu
  Yaroslava Shvedova
  Kirsten Flipkens

Lucky loser
  Julia Vakulenko

Qualifying draw

First qualifier

Second qualifier

Third qualifier

Fourth qualifier

Fifth qualifier

Sixth qualifier

Seventh qualifier

Eighth qualifier

Ninth qualifier

Tenth qualifier

Eleventh qualifier

Twelfth qualifier

External links

2006 Wimbledon Championships on WTAtennis.com
2006 Wimbledon Championships – Women's draws and results at the International Tennis Federation

Women's Singles Qualifying
Wimbledon Championship by year – Women's singles qualifying
Wimbledon Championships